The 1954 Footscray season was the club's 29th since they began competing in the Victorian Football League (VFL) in 1925. After falling short in the Preliminary final the previous season, the Bulldogs finally won through to their first Grand Final, and beat  to claim their first VFL premiership, making them the first of the teams admitted to the VFL in 1925 to do so.

Home-and-Away Season Summary and Results
The Bulldogs went into the 1954 VFL season as premiership contenders. In Round 7 against  at Glenferrie Oval, Footscray, led by Don Ross after Ted Whitten injured his shoulder, came from 23 points down at the last break to kick seven goals and win by nine points. With Richmond upsetting  at Victoria Park that same day, the Bulldogs went to the top of the ladder, where they would stay until Round 11, when they lost to Collingwood by ten points in a top-of-the-ladder clash at Victoria Park. Footscray slipped to fourth in Round 16 when, at Arden Street Oval against North Melbourne, they looked set for a win, being 13 points up with five minutes remaining, before the home side rallied to snatch a draw with a behind on the siren. With two rounds remaining and seven teams still in contention for a finals berth, the pressure was on the Bulldogs when they met second-placed Essendon at Windy Hill. In a performance that set them up for their premiership success, Footscray won the match with a decisive five-goal-to-none third quarter to run out 19-point winners. Whitten was judged best on ground and Collins kicked six goals, while Essendon were clearly missing full-forward John Coleman, who had gone down with a career-ending knee injury earlier in the season.

1954 Finals Series

Captain-coach Charlie Sutton, who had been struggling since injuring his left knee against Carlton, was declared fit by the selectors to play against  in the Semi Final after getting through a training session, but pulled out at the last minute on advice of the club doctor. Lionel Ryan, who had been dropped to accommodate Sutton, was reinstated to the team, and defender Wally Donald took charge of the team on the field.

The Melbourne Cricket Ground was undergoing renovation work to be ready for the 1956 Summer Olympics, and the demolition of the public stand left a gap for the breeze to affect the game. Geelong kicked with the wind in the first quarter, and in the early going it looked like the pace and class which had taken them to the last three Grand Finals would again do the job. The Bulldogs began to work their way into the match, led by their defence – the finest in the League – which managed to restrict Geelong to four goals whilst themselves kicking three against the wind, goals that would be crucial in deciding the outcome.

Ladder

See also 
 1954 VFL Grand Final

References

External links
1954 Results at AFL Tables

Western Bulldogs
1954